8/1 may refer to:

August 1 (month-day date notation)
January 8 (day-month date notation)

See also
8 (disambiguation)